Her is a 2013 American science-fiction romantic drama film written, directed, and produced by Spike Jonze. The film's musical score was composed by Arcade Fire, with the cinematography provided by Hoyte van Hoytema. It marks Jonze's solo screenwriting debut. The film follows Theodore Twombly (Joaquin Phoenix), a man who develops a relationship with Samantha (Scarlett Johansson), a female voice produced by an intelligent computer operating system. The film also stars Amy Adams, Rooney Mara, and Olivia Wilde.

The film premiered at the New York Film Festival on October 12, 2013. Warner Bros. Pictures initially provided a limited release for Her at six theaters on December 18. It was later given a wide release at over 1,700 theaters in the United States and Canada on January 10, 2014. The film grossed a worldwide total of over $47 million on a production budget of $23 million. Rotten Tomatoes, a review aggregator, surveyed 270 reviews and judged 94 percent to be positive.

Her has earned various awards and nominations with particular praise for Jonze's screenplay. The film was also widely praised for its direction, acting (particularly Phoenix and Johansson), cinematography, score, production merits and poignant material. At the 86th Academy Awards, the film was nominated in five categories, including Best Picture, with Jonze winning for Best Original Screenplay. At the 71st Golden Globe Awards, the film garnered three nominations, going on to win Best Screenplay for Jonze. Jonze was also awarded the Best Original Screenplay Award from the Writers Guild of America. Her also won Best Film and Best Director for Jonze at the National Board of Review Awards. The American Film Institute included the film in their list of the top ten films of 2013.

Accolades

See also
2013 in film

References

External links
 

Lists of accolades by film